The 2015 OFC U-20 Women's Championship was the 7th edition of the OFC U-20 Women's Championship, the biennial international youth football championship organised by the Oceania Football Confederation (OFC) for the women's under-20 national teams of Oceania. The tournament was held in Tonga between 1–10 October 2015. The tournament was originally scheduled to be held between 16–30 January 2016.

Same as previous editions, the tournament acted as the OFC qualifiers for the FIFA U-20 Women's World Cup. The winner of the tournament qualified for the 2016 FIFA U-20 Women's World Cup in Papua New Guinea as the OFC representative, besides Papua New Guinea who qualified automatically as hosts.

New Zealand were confirmed as champions for the fifth consecutive time on 8 October 2015, sealing their qualification to the World Cup.

Teams
A total of five OFC member national teams entered the tournament.

Did not enter

Venue
The matches were played at the Loto-Tonga Soka Centre in Nuku'alofa.

Squads

Players born on or after 1 January 1996 were eligible to compete in the tournament.

Matches
The tournament was played in round-robin format. There were two matches on each matchday, with one team having a bye. The draw for the fixtures was held on 2 September 2015 at the OFC Headquarters in Auckland, New Zealand.

All times were local, TOT (UTC+13).

Winners

New Zealand qualified for the FIFA U-20 Women's World Cup for the sixth consecutive time. With hosts Papua New Guinea also participating, this is the first tournament to feature two teams from OFC.

1 Bold indicates champion for that year. Italic indicates host for that year.

Awards
The following awards were given at the conclusion of the tournament.

Goalscorers
25 goals
 Emma Rolston

16 goals
 Jasmine Pereira

5 goals

 Daisy Cleverley
 Grace Jale
 Michaela Robertson

4 goals

 Isabella Coombes
 Emma Main
 Matalena Daniells
 Monica Melteviel

3 goals

 Paige Satchell
 Shalom Fiso
 Ofaloto Laakulu
 Malia Tongia

2 goals

 Marie-Luce Tchacko
 Madeleen Ah Ki
 Priscilla Charley

1 goal

 Isabelle Hace
 Lyndsay Nyipie
 Marlory Oniary
 Jade Parris
 Isabella Richards
 Matalena Faasavalu
 Vaaipu Moaata
 Marcella Nielsen
 Mele Akolo
 Brenda Anis
 Rina Batick
 Clemontine Senis

References

External links
2015 OFC U-20 Women's Championship, oceaniafootball.com

2015
2015 in women's association football
2015–16 in OFC football
2015 OFC U-20 Women's Championship
2015 in Tongan sport
Nukuʻalofa
2015 in youth association football